Lee Ka Ho (born 26 April 1993) is a Hong Kong professional footballer who currently plays for Hong Kong Premier League club Tai Po.

Club career
In 2011, Lee signed for Hong Kong First Division club Sham Shui Po.

On 25 February 2013, Lee made his debut for Sham Shui Po and scored his first goal against TSW Pegasus in a 1–4 loss.

In 2012, Lee signed for Hong Kong First Division League club Yokohama FC Hong Kong (YFCMD).

On 2 September 2012, Lee scored his first goal in Yokohama FC Hong Kong against South China in a 2–5 loss.

In 2015, Lee signed for Hong Kong Premier League club Pegasus.

Following two years away from football, Lee agreed to join Tai Po on 21 July 2018.

On 17 July 2019, Eastern announced the signing of Lee at their season opening media event. On 30 June 2020, Lee left the club.

On 8 August 2022, Lee returned to Tai Po.

Honours

Club
Pegasus
 Hong Kong FA Cup: 2015–16
 Hong Kong Sapling Cup: 2015–16

Tai Po
 Hong Kong Premier League: 2018–19

Match Fixing Scandal
On 6 October 2016, Lee was one of six current and former Pegasus players to be taken in for questioning by the ICAC on allegations of match fixing. He was formally charged on 28 June 2017 for one count each of conspiracy to defraud and accepting an advantage, including allegedly accepting a HKD $20,000 bribe in order to fix a reserve league match in March 2016.

On 19 April 2018, Lee was found not guilty on both charges after the judge ruled that he could not convict him beyond a reasonable doubt.

References

External links
 Lee Ka Ho at HKFA
 

1993 births
Living people
Hong Kong footballers
Hong Kong Premier League players
Hong Kong First Division League players
Sham Shui Po SA players
Metro Gallery FC players
TSW Pegasus FC players
Tai Po FC players
Eastern Sports Club footballers
Association football wing halves
Association football defenders